Knotten is a surname. Notable people with the surname include: 

Guri Knotten (born 1974), Norwegian cross-country skier
Iver Knotten (born 1998), Norwegian cyclist
Karoline Offigstad Knotten (born 1995), Norwegian biathlete